Home Farm was the estate farm for Brodick Castle. It now houses a series of tourist enterprises including a cheese shop and Arran Aromatics. This was the site of the curiously named Khartoum which was a kind of shanty town. It appears that makeshift towns all over Britain were given exotic names in a kind of ironic way.

Opposite Home Farm is Murchie Sand Pit, which is Arran's largest lowland pond (or loch). The sands and gravels have a variety of uses but the most famous is that of being used for water purification in Saudi Arabia, a case of selling coals to Newcastle.

Isle of Arran